Lasiothyris ilingocornuta is a species of moth of the family Tortricidae. It is found in Brazil in the Federal District, Minas Gerais and Goias.

References

Moths described in 1993
Cochylini